Artocarpus is a genus of approximately 60 trees and shrubs of Southeast Asian and Pacific origin, belonging to the mulberry family, Moraceae. Most species of Artocarpus are restricted to Southeast Asia; a few cultivated species are more widely distributed, especially A. altilis (breadfruit) and A. heterophyllus (jackfruit), which are cultivated throughout the tropics.

Description 
All Artocarpus species are laticiferous trees or shrubs that are composed of leaves, twigs and stems capable of producing a milky sap. The flora type is monoecious and produces unisexual flowers; furthermore, both sexes are present within the same plant. The plants produce small, greenish, female flowers that grow on short, fleshy spikes. Following pollination, the flowers grow into a syncarpous fruit, and these are capable of growing into very large sizes. The stipulated leaves vary from small and entire (Artocarpus integer) to large and lobed (Artocarpus altilis), with the cordate leaves of the species A. altilis ending in long, sharp tips.

Taxonomy
The name Artocarpus is derived from the Greek words artos ("bread") and karpos ("fruit"). This name was coined by Johann Reinhold Forster and J. Georg Adam Forster, a father-and-son team of botanists aboard HMS Resolution on James Cook's second voyage; they used it in their book Characteres generum plantarum. It is maintained as a conserved name.

Although fossils of Artocarpus have been reported from as early as the Late Cretaceous, these fossils generally that lack key diagnostic characters such as that could definitively place them in the genus. The last common ancestor of all living Artocarpus likely originated in the vicinity of Borneo, from which Artocarpus dispersed elsewhere in Asia and Oceania.

Subgenera
Recent phylogenetic research, based on leaf arrangement, leaf anatomical characters and stipules, indicates that there are at least two subgenera in Artocarpus:
Subgenus Artocarpus: Perianth of fruit is partially connate (fused).
Subgenus Pseudojaca: Perianth is entirely connate.
Subgenus Cauliflori
Subgenus Pseudojaca is allied to the genus Prainea, and some researchers treat this taxon as a fourth subgenus of Artocarpus.

Extant species

Fossil record
Fossil leaves and fruits of †Artocarpus dicksoni have been found in Cretaceous formations of West Greenland. Fossil leaves of †Artocarpus ordinarius have been found in Cretaceous stratum at the south bank of the Yukon River just above Rampart, Alaska. Fossils of †Artocarpus californica have been described from Eocene and Miocene strata of the Pacific coast of California and Oregon. 8 fossil species of Artocarpus (†A. capellinii, †A. isseli, †A. macrophylla, †A. massalongoi, †A. multinervis, †A. ovalifolia, †A. sismondai and †A. taramellii)  from the lower Oligocene, have been described from a fossil leaves collected from 1857 to 1889 in Santa Giustina and Sassello in Central Liguria, Italy.

Uses
Several species in the genus bear edible fruit and are commonly cultivated: Breadfruit (Artocarpus altilis), Cempedak (Artocarpus integer), Jackfruit (Artocarpus heterophyllus), Kwai Muk (Artocarpus parvus), Lakoocha (Artocarpus lakoocha), Pudau (Artocarpus kemando), Anjily (a.k.a. Jungle Jack) (Artocarpus hirsutus), Chaplaish (Artocarpus chama), and Marang (Artocarpus odoratissimus).

Breadfruit and jackfruit are cultivated widely in the tropical Southeast Asia. Other species are cultivated locally for their timber, fruit or edible seeds. Anjily, A. hirsutus, is grown for fruit and timber in the Western Ghats.

Gallery

See also
Domesticated plants and animals of Austronesia

Notes

References
Zerega, N. J. C. and T. J. Motley. 2001. Artocarpus (Moraceae) molecular phylogeny and the systematics and origins of breadfruit, Artocarpus altilis. Botanical Society of America Annual Meeting. Albuquerque, NM. August 12–16, 2001.

 
Moraceae genera
Taxa named by Johann Reinhold Forster
Taxa named by Georg Forster